Jialin is the Pinyin romanisation of various Chinese given names, also spelled Chia-lin in the Wade–Giles system used in the early 20th century and still common in Taiwan. People with these names include:

Yen Chia-lin (1890–1960), Chinese male educationalist, founder of Scouting in China
Qin Jialin (1919–2002), Chinese male diplomat
Xie Jialin (1920–2016), Chinese male physicist
Chen Jialin (born 1942), Chinese male film director
Tang Jialin (born 1991), Chinese female biathlete
Hsu Chia-lin (born 1992), Taiwanese male taekwondo practitioner
Dong Jialin (born 1993), Chinese male football goalkeeper

See also
Jialing (disambiguation)

Chinese given names